Desenzano del Garda-Sirmione railway station serves the town and comune of Desenzano del Garda, in the region of Lombardy, northern Italy.  Opened in 1854, it forms part of the Milan–Venice railway.

The station is currently managed by Rete Ferroviaria Italiana (RFI).  However, the commercial area of the passenger building is managed by Centostazioni. Each of these companies is a subsidiary of Ferrovie dello Stato (FS), Italy's state-owned rail company. Train services are operated by Trenitalia and Trenord.

Location
Desenzano del Garda-Sirmione railway station is situated in Piazza Einaudi, at the end of Viale Cavour, near the southern edge of the town centre.

History
The station was opened on 12 April 1854, together with the bridge at Peschiera del Garda on the Mincio river, and the Desenzano Viaduct.  Between 1909 and 1969, it was also a junction station for a short line to Desenzano Harbour, on Lake Garda.

Features
The passenger building is a rectangular structure made of stone.  It has a total of three storeys, only two of which rise above track level.  Until the late nineteenth century, an iron shed with a sloping roof protected the first two tracks from the weather.  During the steam era, the station was also equipped with a water tower formed of a simple iron tank raised and supported by concrete piers.

The station yard has six tracks. In addition to two running tracks for the Milan - Venice railway, there is a third track for overtaking, and three reserved for the composition and transit of freight trains or the storage of rail vehicles used for the maintenance of the line.

There are also two covered platforms serving the three tracks reserved for passenger service.  Both are connected by an underpass, which also links the passenger building with the parking lot to the south, on the opposite side of the tracks.

From the third track, shortly after the switch (point) on the line heading towards Peschiera, is the location where the line to Desenzano Harbour, now abandoned, once branched off.  Until the 1980s, a short section of line remained in place there for use in connection with the nearby electrical substation.

Train services
The following services call at the station:

High speed services (Frecciabianca) Turin - Milan - Brescia - Verona - Vicenza - Padua - Venice (- Trieste)
High speed services (Frecciabianca) Milan - Brescia - Verona - Vicenza - Padua - Venice - Treviso - Udine
Night train (Thello) Paris - Milan - Verona - Padua - Venice
Night train (EuroNight) Milan - Verona - Venice - Villach - Klagenfurt - Vienna
Express services (Treno regionale) Milan - Treviglio - Brescia - Desanzano del Garda - Peschiera del Garda - Verona
Regional services (Treno regionale) Brescia - Verona - Vicenza - Padua - Venice (1x per day)

Passenger and train movements
The station has about 1.5 million passenger movements each year.

The majority of trains passing through the station, including some Eurostar Italia trains, stop there.  They link the station directly with many destinations, both domestic and international.

Gallery

See also

History of rail transport in Italy
List of railway stations in Lombardy
Rail transport in Italy
Railway stations in Italy

References

External links

Description and pictures of Desenzano del Garda-Sirmione railway station 

This article is based upon a translation of the Italian language version as at January 2011.

Railway stations in Lombardy
Buildings and structures in the Province of Brescia
Province of Brescia
Railway stations opened in 1854
1854 establishments in the Austrian Empire